Sir John Trevelyan, 4th Baronet (6 February 1735 – 18 April 1828), of Nettlecombe Court in Somerset, was a British politician who sat in the House of Commons from 1777 to 1796.

Origins
A member of an ancient family of Cornwall, he was the only son and heir of Sir George Trevelyan, 3rd Baronet (1707–1768) of Nettlecombe.

Career
He served as High Sheriff of Somerset for 1777-8 and sat as a Member of Parliament for Newcastle-upon-Tyne from 1777 to 1780 and for Somerset from 1780 to 1796. In 1784 he was a member of the St. Alban's Tavern group who tried to bring Fox and Pitt together.

Marriage and issue

He married Louisa Marianne Simond, a daughter and co-heiress of Peter Simond of London, a Huguenot merchant. He inherited various Northumbrian estates from his wife's uncle in 1777.
By his wife he had 6 sons and 2 daughters including:
Sir John Trevelyan, 5th Baronet (1761–1846), eldest son and heir, father of Sir Walter Calverley Trevelyan, 6th Baronet (1797–1879);
Walter Trevelyan (1763–1830), 2nd son;
Venerable George Trevelyan (1765–1827), 3rd son, Rector of Nettlecombe, Canon of Wells and Archdeacon of Taunton, father of:
Henry Willoughby Trevelyan (1803–1876), a Major-General in the British Army, father of Sir Ernest John Trevelyan (1850–1929), a Judge of the High Court of Calcutta, a writer on legal matters and a member of the Oxford Town Council. 
Sir Charles Trevelyan, 1st Baronet (1807–1886) of Wallington Hall, near Cambo in Northumberland, title created in 1874; the 1st Baronet's grandson was the historian George Macaulay Trevelyan (1876–1962)
Reverend William Pitt Trevelyan (1812–1905), 6th son, father of Reverend George Philip Trevelyan (1858–1937), father of Humphrey Trevelyan, Baron Trevelyan, a diplomat and author.

Death
He died in April 1828, aged 93.

References

Kidd, Charles, Williamson, David (editors). Debrett's Peerage and Baronetage (1990 edition). New York: St Martin's Press, 1990, 

1735 births
1828 deaths
Baronets in the Baronetage of England
Members of the Parliament of Great Britain for English constituencies
British MPs 1774–1780
British MPs 1780–1784
British MPs 1784–1790
British MPs 1790–1796
High Sheriffs of Somerset